European contact may refer to:

Exploration 
European colonization of the Americas
European exploration of Australia, encompasses several waves of seafarers and land explorers
European exploration of Africa, began with Ancient Greeks and Romans, who explored and established settlements in North Africa

Colonization 

Colonialism, the establishment, exploitation, maintenance, acquisition and expansion of colonies in one territory by people from another territory
Colonization of Africa
European colonization of the Americas, typically dated to 1492, when a Spanish expedition headed by Christopher Columbus sailed for India to open trade but inadvertently landed in the Americas

See also
Population history of American indigenous peoples
Columbian Exchange, a dramatically widespread exchange of animals, plants, culture, human populations (including slaves), communicable disease, and ideas between the American and Afro-Eurasian Hemispheres following the voyage to the Americas by Christopher Columbus in 1492.:163 The term was coined in 1972 by Alfred W
Kirishitan, from Portuguese cristão, referred to Roman Catholic Christians in Japanese and is used in Japanese texts as a historiographic term for Roman Catholics in Japan in the 16th and 17th centuries